The 1945 Fremantle by-election was held in the Australian federal electorate of Fremantle in Western Australia on 18 August 1945. The by-election was triggered by the death of the sitting member, Prime Minister John Curtin, on 5 July 1945.

Results

See also
 List of Australian federal by-elections

References

External links
Election figures (John Curtin Prime Ministerial Library, including polling places breakdown)

1945 elections in Australia
Western Australian federal by-elections
1940s in Western Australia
August 1945 events in Australia